Connersville is an unincorporated community in Harrison County, Kentucky, in the United States.

History
A post office was established at Connersville in 1849, and remained in operation until it was discontinued in 1904. The community was named for Lewis Conner.

References

Unincorporated communities in Harrison County, Kentucky
Unincorporated communities in Kentucky